X Factor is a Ukrainian television music competition to find new singing talent and part of a British franchise The X Factor. The eight series began on 2 September 2017 and will conclude on 30 December 2017. The judging panel consists of Oleg Vinnik, Nastya Kamenskykh, Dmitry Shurov and Andriy Danylko. Andrey Bednyakov returned as presenter of the main show on STB.

Selection process

Auditions

Judges' houses

Finalists
 – Winner
 – Runner-up
 – Third Place

Live shows

Results summary

Colour key

Live show details

Week 1 (11 November)

Week 2 (18 November)

Week 3 (25 November)

Week 4 (2 December)

Week 5 (9 December)

Week 6 (16 December)

Week 7 Semi-final (23 December)

Week 8 Final (30 December) 

2017 Ukrainian television seasons